Surrounded by Silence may refer to

Surrounded by Silence (album), an album by Prefuse 73.
Surrounded by Silence (song), a song by Design the Skyline.

pl:Surrounded by Silence